James Louis Lindsay (16 December 1906 – 27 August 1997) was a British Conservative Party politician.

Background and education
Lindsay was the younger son of David Lindsay, 27th Earl of Crawford, and Constance Lilian, daughter of Sir Henry Pelly, 3rd Baronet. David Lindsay, 28th Earl of Crawford, was his elder brother. He was educated at Eton and Magdalen College, Oxford.

Political career
Lindsay fought in the Second World War as a Major in the King's Royal Rifle Corps. At the 1955 general election he was elected as Member of Parliament (MP) for North Devon, succeeding Christopher Peto. He served for one term until the 1959 election, when he lost his seat by only 362 votes to the Liberal candidate Jeremy Thorpe, who went on to become his party's leader.

Family
James Lindsay came from a political family, and was elected to Parliament in the same election as his nephew Lord Balniel (who represented Hertford, also as a Conservative). He married the Hon Bronwen Mary Scott-Ellis, daughter of Thomas Scott-Ellis, 8th Baron Howard de Walden, in 1933. They had three sons and one daughter:

 Hugh John Alexander Lindsay (born 30 July 1934)
 Colonel Alexander Thomas Lindsay (born 18 December 1936)
 Lt Col Stephen James Lindsay (born 2 March 1940)
 Julia Margaret Lindsay (born 24 September 1941)

James Lindsay died in August 1997, aged 90.

References

External links
 

1906 births
1997 deaths
Alumni of Magdalen College, Oxford
People educated at Eton College
Conservative Party (UK) MPs for English constituencies
UK MPs 1955–1959
Younger sons of earls
King's Royal Rifle Corps officers
British Army personnel of World War II
James